Kévin Sireau (born 18 April 1987) is a French professional racing cyclist.

Major results

2003
3rd Sprint, French National Track Championships, Novice
2004
2nd Sprint, French National Track Championships, Junior
2005
1st Kilo, French National Track Championships, Junior
1st Sprint, French National Track Championships, Junior
1st  Team Sprint, French National Track Championships, Senior
1st Team Sprint, European Track Championships, Junior
2nd Sprint, European Track Championships, Junior
2nd Team Sprint, UCI Track Cycling World Championships, Junior
2nd Kilo, UCI Track Cycling World Championships, Junior
2nd Sprint, UCI Track Cycling World Championships, Junior
2006
2nd Kilo, French National Track Championships
1st Sprint, French National Track Championships
1st Keirin, French National Track Championships
2nd Kilo, UCI Track World Cup, Moscow (RUS)
3rd Team Sprint, UCI Track World Cup, Moscow (RUS)
2007
2nd Team Sprint, UCI Track World Cup, Los Angeles (USA)
2nd  Sprint, European Track Championships, U23
1st Keirin, European Track Championships, U23
2nd Sprint, French National Track Championships
3rd Team Sprint, UCI Track World Cup, Sydney (AUS)
2nd Sprint, UCI Track World Cup, Sydney (AUS)
2008
1st Team Sprint, UCI Track World Cup, Los Angeles (USA)
2nd Sprint, UCI Track World Cup, Los Angeles (USA)
1st Sprint, European Track Championships
2009
1st Sprint, European Track Championships
1st Team Sprint, European Track Championships
World Record, Flying 200m time trial (9.572 seconds in Moscow, Russia on 30 May 2009)
2nd Sprint, French National Track Championships
3rd Keirin, French National Track Championships
1st Sprint 2008–09 UCI Track Cycling World Ranking
1st Team sprint 2008–09 UCI Track Cycling World Ranking
2010
1st Sprint, French National Track Championships
1st Keirin, French National Track Championships
1st Sprint 2009–10 UCI Track Cycling World Ranking
1st Team sprint 2009–10 UCI Track Cycling World Ranking
2011
1st Sprint, European Track Championships
1st Sprint 2010–11 UCI Track Cycling World Ranking
1st Team sprint 2010–11 UCI Track Cycling World Ranking
2014
1st Team sprint, Fenioux Piste International
2nd Keirin, Fenioux Piste International

References

External links
 

1987 births
Living people
People from Châteauroux
French male cyclists
Cyclists at the 2008 Summer Olympics
Cyclists at the 2012 Summer Olympics
Olympic cyclists of France
Olympic silver medalists for France
UCI Track Cycling World Champions (men)
Olympic medalists in cycling
Medalists at the 2012 Summer Olympics
Medalists at the 2008 Summer Olympics
French track cyclists
Sportspeople from Indre
Cyclists from Centre-Val de Loire